Crotaphatrema lamottei, the Mount Oku caecilian or Lamotte's caecilian, is a species of caecilian in the family Scolecomorphidae. It is endemic to Mount Oku in Cameroon. The specific name lamottei honours , French biologist. There is some doubt whether Crotaphatrema tchabalmbaboensis really is distinct from this species.

Description
Males measure  and adult females  in total length. There are 115–129 primary annuli that are incomplete ventrally. The eyes are not externally visible. The dorsum is tan-brown in preservative and sienna brown and pale lilac in life. The venter is cream. The lateral margins of the upper jaws and the area surrounding tentacular apertures are cream. The tip of the snout is tan-brown.

Habitat and conservation
It is assumed to be oviparous and not to depend on water bodies for reproduction.

Crotaphatrema lamottei has a low population density and restricted distribution, although its exact range remains poorly mapped. Agriculture, grazing, fire, and forest fragmentation threaten natural habitats at Mount Oku, but it is not known how these changes affect this particular species. It is sometimes killed by local people, perhaps because of being confused with snakes. Some habitat at Mount Oku is protected.

References

lamottei
Endemic fauna of Cameroon
Amphibians of Cameroon
Amphibians described in 1981
Taxa named by Ronald Archie Nussbaum
Taxonomy articles created by Polbot